An International development minister is a position in many governments responsible for development aid and international development.

Country-related articles and lists 

: Minister for International Development
: Minister of International Development
: Minister of Foreign Affairs and International Development
: Minister of State for Overseas development aid
: Minister for Foreign Trade and Development Cooperation
: Minister of International Development
: Minister for International Development Cooperation
: Formerly Secretary of State for International Development; now Secretary of State for Foreign, Commonwealth and Development Affairs
: Minister for International Development and Europe

Government ministers by portfolio
Foreign aid by country